Ucides is a genus of mangrove crabs in the monotypic family Ucididae, containing two species:
 Ucides cordatus (Linnaeus, 1763) – Atlantic coast from Florida to Uruguay
 Ucides occidentalis (Ortmann, 1897) – Pacific coast from Mexico to Peru

References

External links

Ocypodoidea
Taxa named by Mary J. Rathbun